The Legion of Campine or KL was a group of the Belgian resistance during the Second World War which operated in the Campine region in the provinces of Limburg and Antwerp by the Dutch border.

References

External links

Belgian resistance groups